Marine Corps Depot of Supplies, Schuylkill Warehouse was a historic warehouse located in the Schuylkill neighborhood of Philadelphia, Pennsylvania.  The structure was demolished in 2015 to make way for the Children's Hospital of Philadelphia expansion.  It was built in two sections in 1941 and in 1943. It was a six-story, orange brick building in the Moderne-style. A one-story, brick addition was built about 1970.  It has an off-center tower over the entrance, unornamented parapet and flat roof, long bands of steel windows, and wide loading bays separated by rounded concrete columns.  It was built by and occupied by the United States Marine Corps into the 1960s.  Afterwards, it was used as a vocational training facility, the John F. Kennedy Vocational Center, by the School District of Philadelphia into the 1980s.  It was later used for administrative offices and storage.

It was added to the National Register of Historic Places in 2004.

References

Military facilities on the National Register of Historic Places in Philadelphia
Moderne architecture in Pennsylvania
Infrastructure completed in 1943
Southwest Center City, Philadelphia